The mean effective pressure (MEP) is a quantity relating to the operation of a reciprocating engine and is a measure of an engine's capacity to do work that is independent of engine displacement. When quoted as an indicated mean effective pressure (IMEP), it may be thought of as the average pressure acting on a piston during the different portions of its cycle.

Derivation
Let:
 = work per cycle in joule;
 = power output in watt;
 = mean effective pressure in pascal;
 = displacement volume in cubic metre;
 = number of revolutions per power stroke (for a 4-stroke engine);
 = number of revolutions per second;
 = torque in newton-metre.

The power produced by the engine is equal to the work done per operating cycle times the number of operating cycles per second. We can write:

Reordering to put work on the left:

By definition:

so that

Since the torque T is related to the angular speed (which is just N·2π) and power produced,

then the equation for MEP in terms of torque is:

Speed has dropped out of the equation, and the only variables are the torque and displacement volume. Since the range of maximum brake mean effective pressures for good engine designs is well established, we now have a displacement-independent measure of the torque-producing capacity of an engine design a specific torque of sorts. This is useful for comparing engines of different displacements. Mean effective pressure is also useful for initial design calculations; that is, given a torque, standard MEP values can be used to estimate the required engine displacement. However, mean effective pressure does not reflect the actual pressures inside an individual combustion chamber although the two are certainly related and serves only as a convenient measure of performance.

Brake mean effective pressure (BMEP) is calculated from measured dynamometer torque. Net indicated mean effective pressure (IMEPn) is calculated using the indicated power; i.e., the pressure volume integral in the work per cycle equation. Sometimes the term FMEP (friction mean effective pressure) is used as an indicator of the mean effective pressure lost to friction (or friction torque), and is just the difference between IMEPn and BMEP.

Examples 

MEP from torque and displacement

A four-stroke engine produces 160 N·m of torque, and displaces 2000 cm3=2 dm3=0.002 m3:

We also get the megapascal figure if we use cubic centimetres for :

Power from MEP and crankshaft speed
If we know the crankshaft speed, we can also determine the engine's power output from the MEP figure: 
In our example, the engine puts out 160 N·m of torque at 3600 min−1:

As piston engines usually have their maximum torque at a lower rotating speed than the maximum power output, the BMEP is lower at full power (at higher rotating speed). If the same engine is rated 76 kW at 5400 min−1 = 90 s−1, and its BMEP is 0.844 MPa, we get the following equation:

Types of mean effective pressures
Mean effective pressure (MEP) is defined by the location measurement and method of calculation, some commonly used MEPs are given here.

 Brake mean effective pressure (BMEP) - Mean effective pressure calculated from measured brake torque.
 Gross indicated mean effective pressure (IMEPg) - Mean effective pressure calculated from in-cylinder pressure over compression and expansion portion of engine cycle (360° in a four-stroke, 180° in a two-stroke).  Direct measurement requires cylinder pressure sensing equipment.
 Net indicated mean effective pressure (IMEPn) - Mean effective pressure calculated from in-cylinder pressure over the complete engine cycle (720° in a four-stroke, 360° in a two-stroke).  Direct measurement requires cylinder pressure sensing equipment.
 Pumping mean effective pressure (PMEP) - Mean effective pressure from work moving air in and out of the cylinder, across the intake and exhaust valves. Calculated from in-cylinder pressure over intake and exhaust portions of engine cycle (360° in a four-stroke, 0° in a two-stroke).  Direct measurement requires cylinder pressure sensing equipment. PMEP = IMEPg - IMEPn.
 Friction mean effective pressure (FMEP) - Theoretical mean effective pressure required to overcome engine friction, can be thought of as mean effective pressure lost due to friction. Friction mean effective pressure calculation requires accurate measurement of cylinder pressure and dynamometer brake torque.  FMEP = IMEPn - BMEP.

BMEP typical values

See also
 Compression ratio

Notes and references

Notes

References

External links 
Brake Mean Effective Pressure (bmep), Power and Torque, Factory Pipe
All About Mean Effective Pressure, Harleyc.com

Tiddler steam engine

Piston engines
Engine technology